Wentworth East was a provincial riding in Ontario, Canada, that was created for the 1987 election. It was abolished prior to the 1999 election. It was merged into the riding of Wentworth-Burlington.

Members of Provincial Parliament

References

Former provincial electoral districts of Ontario